The women's individual archery event at the 2012 Olympic Games was held from 27 July to 2 August 2012 at Lord's Cricket Ground in London in the United Kingdom. The event was one of four which comprised the 2012 Olympic archery programme of sports and was the eleventh time the women's individual competition was contested as an Olympic event. Forty different nations qualified for the competition, sending a total of sixty-four archers to compete. The defending Olympic champion from 2008 was Zhang Juanjuan of China, who did not compete following her retirement in 2010.

Ki Bo-Bae of South Korea won the gold medal, defeating Mexico's Aída Román in a one-arrow shoot-off to become her nation's seventh female archer to become individual Olympic champion. Mariana Avitia of Mexico finished third, defeating Khatuna Lorig of the United States to win the bronze medal. Román and Avitia became the first Mexican archers to ever win an Olympic medal.

Background
The women's individual event has been held as part of every Summer Olympics archery programme since the 1972 Games in Munich. Since the 1984 Summer Olympics, archers from South Korea had dominated the event, claiming six of the previous seven gold medals. Their winning streak was broken at the 2008 Summer Olympics in Beijing when Zhang Juanjuan defeating defending Olympic champion Park Sung-hyun in the final, becoming the first non-South Korean archer to win the women's individual gold medal since Keto Losaberidze of the Soviet Union in 1980.

In October 2011 an official test event, the London Archery Classic, was held at the Lord's Cricket Ground to evaluate the venue's preparations and give archers and coaches the chance to familiarise themselves with the location and schedule ahead of the Games the following year. Jung Dasomi of South Korea, who held the top position in the World Archery rankings, won the women's individual event, defeating Poland's Justyna Mospinek in the final. Ki Bo-bae of South Korea won the bronze medal ahead of Japan's Ren Hayakama.

Qualification

Sixty-four places were available for the event with each National Olympic Committee (NOC) being represented by a maximum of three archers. Qualification was primarily achieved through the World Archery Championships held in Turin in July 2011, with the remaining places allocated to the nations of most successful athletes at a series of continental championships held between October 2011 and May 2012. As host nation Great Britain qualified three places automatically; ten other nations (China, Denmark, India, Italy, Japan, Mexico, Russia, South Korea, Chinese Taipei, and Ukraine) additionally qualified the maximum berth of archers.

Great Britain's national selection trials saw Olympic debutante Amy Oliver and two-time Olympian Naomi Folkard succeed to partner  2004 Olympic bronze medalist Alison Williamson, who became the third British athlete to be selected for a sixth Olympic Games, having made her debut at the 1992 Summer Olympics in Barcelona. Chekrovolu Swuro and the highly rated 18-year old Deepika Kumari joined 2008 Olympian Bombayla Devi Laishram to spearhead the Indian contingent, the trio having together won silver medal in the women's team event at the 2011 World Archery Championships after defeating the reigning champions South Korea in the semi-finals.

Format

The women's individual was an outdoor recurve target archery event. Held under the World Archery-approved rules, archers shot at a 122 cm-wide target from a distance of 70 metres with between one and ten points being awarded for each arrow depending on how close it landed to the centre of the target. The competition consisted of three stages: an initial ranking round, five elimination rounds, and two finals matches deciding the medal placings. In the ranking round, each of the 64 archers entering the competition shot a total of 72 arrows. The total score of each archer was used to seed the archers into the following five-round single-elimination tournament according to their finishing position, the highest-scoring archer receiving the number one seed.

The elimination rounds introduced a new format, the Archery Olympic Round, to the Olympic Games. From 1992 until 2008, the elimination matches were decided by each archer shooting 12 arrows, the highest cumulative score determining who progressed to the next round. Approved in 2009 by the sport's governing body, the World Archery Federation, the new Archery Olympic Round was designed to sustain audience interest throughout the knockout matches and prevent encounters from being decided prematurely from a single poor shot. According to the new system, each match consisted of a maximum of five sets, with archers each shooting three arrows per set. The archer with the best score from their three arrows won the set, earning two points. The archer with the lowest score in each set received zero points. If the score was tied, each archer received one point. The first archer to six points was declared the winner. If the match was tied 5-5 after the maximum 5 sets were played, a single tie-breaker arrow was used with the closest to centre of the target winning.

Schedule

Report

Pre-event
In a preview of the archery competitions published a couple of weeks before the beginning of the Games, the Korea Herald expressed some reservation about the chances of a South Korean victory in the women's individual event. Although they suggested the women's team should be "supremely confident" of a gold medal in their event, the failure to win the individual gold medal in 2008 and the rise of India's Deepika Kumari were highlighted as concerns going forward into the event. Kumari, who was cited by the Hindustan Times as India's best chance at winning an individual archery medal, in turn was confident that her experience against the Koreans in Archery World Cup matches would serve her well. Speaking at a ceremony marking the departure of athletes to London, she added that her recently acquired status of world number one would only be justified if she came away from the Games having earned an Olympic medal.

Ranking round
The competition began with the ranking round in the afternoon of Friday 27 July, preceding the opening ceremony held later that evening. Ki Bo-bae, Lee Sung-jin, and Tan Ya-ting each tied on 671 points and were only separated by the number of arrows landing in the 10-ring, Ki claiming number one seed with thirty-one 10-scores ahead of Lee and Tan. South Korea's third archer Choi Hyeon-ju struggled with nerves on her Olympic debut and finished 21st overall after being ranked 38th at the round's halfway point. Despite claiming two of the highest seeds for the elimination rounds, Jang Young-sool, the head of the South Korean archery coaching team, was nevertheless disappointed that his archers did not post higher scores. The three British archers had a disappointing ranking round on home soil, Naomi Folkard finishing highest, claiming the 42nd seed.

Elimination rounds
World number one Deepika Kumari suffered a shock defeat in the opening elimination round which began on the morning of 30 July, losing to 57th seed Amy Oliver of Great Britain in four sets. Kumari blamed the strong winds for her performance and did not appear comfortable in the cool and overcast conditions, failing to shoot a single arrow in the 10-ring. Her defeat was described by the Press Trust of India as a big setback in India's pursuit of Olympic medals, while the BBC lauded Oliver's victory as her greatest career win. Oliver would later lose to Indonesia's Ika Yuliana Rochmawati in the following round. Oliver's teammates Alison Williamson and Folkard fared little better in front of the home crowd, Williamson losing in the first knockout round to Bishindee Urantungalag of Mongolia, while Folkard was eliminated by Mexico's Mariana Avitia in the 1/16 elimination round. The first elimination round also saw Bhutan's participation at the Olympic Games end with Serhab Zam's defeat to Lorig of the United States, the nation having sent just two athletes to London.

The final rounds took place on Thursday, 2 August. In the 1/8 elimination round Bérengère Schuh, the sole Frenchwoman in the field, defeated Choi in a one-arrow shoot-off after the South Korean came back from four set points down to tie the match in the fifth set.
With windy conditions developing in the afternoon in time for the quarter-finals, Lorig defeated Schuh after a poor third set by the Frenchwoman, who was unable to fully master the conditions, while Avitia emerged as the surprise victor against second-seed Lee. Lee's exit marked the first time since the 1996 Summer Olympics that South Korea failed to win at least two medals in the women's individual event.

Ki, the sole South Korean to advance to the semi-finals, dispatched Khatuna Lorig following an upgraded score of one of her arrows after a review in the fourth set. The second semi-final featured Avitia and Román, guaranteeing at least one medal for the Mexican archery contingent. Román advanced to the final against Ki, while Avitia went on to contest the bronze medal match with Lorig.

Medal matches

Avitia appeared more comfortable with the shifting winds in the bronze medal match, which began just after 3:20pm on 2 August, scoring a perfect 30 in the first set and ultimately winning in four sets after Lorig shot a six with her final arrow. Lorig nevertheless managed a shot so precise to the centre of the target that the arrow bounced off the target after striking the camera hole. Three years later the American reflected that she did not have enough time to recover from her semi-final loss to Ki and was unable to properly focus against Avitia, beginning the bronze medal match just fifteen minutes after bowing out of the semi-finals. She commented "I was so upset not making that gold medal match... [i]t happened so quick, I didn’t have time to talk to anyone. There was no one to tell me, 'Hey, snap out of it.'" Avitia's victory gave Mexico its first ever Olympic archery medal.

The gold medal match between Ki and Román was a close affair. After winning one set apiece with a tie in the second set, Ki shot a perfect 30 in the fourth, only for Román to outscore Ki 27–26 in the fifth and final set, necessitating a shoot-off. Both Ki and Román landed their arrows into the 8-ring, but Ki's was judged to be marginally closer to the centre, giving her the victory.

Ki's win was the seventh time in eight Olympic women's individual events that South Korea had claimed the top honour, and the fourteenth archery gold medal from a possible fifteen for the country since the 1984 Summer Olympics. A tearful Ki later apologised during a press conference after she had been awarded her the gold medal, stating that "Koreans do not shoot eights". Román and Avitia meanwhile received a call from the President of Mexico congratulating them on achieving their nation's debut Olympic archery medals. Their double success was the first time since the 1984 Summer Olympics in Los Angeles that Mexican athletes had won two medals in the same discipline at the same Games, and the first time that it had been achieved by Mexican women.

Records
70 metres - 72 arrow ranking round

Both the Olympic record score of 673, set by Ukraine's Lina Herasymenko at the 1996 Summer Olympics and equalled by South Korea's Park Sung-hyun at the 2008 Summer Olympics, and the existing world record score of 682, set by Park one day before the 2004 Summer Olympics opening ceremony, remained intact at the conclusion of the event.

Results

Ranking round

Elimination rounds

Section 1

Section 2

Section 3

Section 4

Note: A superscript denotes a win from a one-arrow shoot-off

Finals

Note: A superscript denotes a win from a one-arrow shoot-off

Notes

References

External links
2012 Olympic Games at World Archery
Full coverage of the final three rounds hosted on YouTube

Archery at the 2012 Summer Olympics
2012 in women's archery
Women's events at the 2012 Summer Olympics